Palazzo Orio Semitecolo Benzon is a Gothic palace in Venice, Italy, built in the 14th century. The palazzo is located in the Dorsoduro district and overlooks the Grand Canal between Casa Santomaso and Casa Salviati.

History
Built by the Orio family of ancient nobility, the palace was united with Palazzo Salviati when it was built during the 20th century.

Architecture
The facade, mainly characterized by Gothic forms of the 14th and 15th centuries, has different features on each floor. The first noble floor has a hexafora composed of four balustrated windows and two side monoforas supported by pillars and projecting balconies. The second noble floor has a bifora, supported by a projecting balcony, on the left and two monoforas on the right. The top floor was added in the 19th century and is rather featureless. The water portal has a dentiled frame and bears a shield of the Benzoni family, dating back to the 14-15th centuries and made of the Istrian stone.

Gallery

References

Houses completed in the 14th century
Palaces in Sestiere Dorsoduro
Gothic architecture in Venice